Pomace, or marc (from French marc ), is the solid remains of grapes, olives, or other fruit after pressing for juice or oil. It contains the skins, pulp, seeds, and stems of the fruit.

Grape pomace has traditionally been used to produce pomace brandy (such as grappa, orujo, törkölypálinka, zivania). Today, it is mostly used as fodder, as fertilizer, or for the extraction of bioactive compounds like polyphenols.

History
"Pomace" is derived from the Latin "pomum" (fruit and fruit tree). The English were the first to use the term "pomace" to refer to the byproduct of cider production.
In the Middle Ages, pomace wine with a low alcohol content of three or four percent was widely available. This wine was made by adding water to pomace and then fermenting it. Generally, medieval wines were not fermented to dryness; consequently the pomace would retain some residual sugar after fermenting.

Piquette

The ancient Greeks and Romans used pomace to create a wine that later became known as piquette in France and Graspia or Vin Piccolo in Veneto. This was an inferior wine normally given to slaves and common workers. After the wine grapes had been pressed twice, the pomace was soaked in water for a day and pressed for a third time. The resulting liquid was mixed with more water to produce a thin, weak and thirst-quenching wine.

Uses
Apple pomace is often used to produce pectin and can be used to make ciderkin, a weak cider, as well as white cider, a strong and colourless alcoholic drink.

Distilling

Grape pomace is used to produce pomace brandy and piquette. Most wine-producing cultures began making some type of pomace brandy after the principles of distillation were understood.

Winemaking
Pomace in winemaking differs, depending upon whether white wine or red wine is being produced.

In red wine production, pomace is produced after the free run juice (the juice created before pressing by the weight of gravity) is poured off, leaving behind dark blackish-red debris consisting of grape skins and stems. The color of red wine is derived from skin contact during the maceration period, which sometimes includes partial fermentation. The resulting pomace is more alcoholic and tannic than pomace produced from white wine production. Pomace from the Italian wine Amarone is macerated in Valpolicella wine to produce Ripasso.

In white wine production, grapes are quickly pressed after crushing to avoid skin contact with pomace as a byproduct of the pressing. The resulting debris is a pale, greenish-brown color and contains more residual sugars than it contains tannins and alcohol. This is the pomace normally used in brandy production.

Other uses

Pomace is produced in large quantities in wine production, making its disposal an important environmental consideration. Some wineries use the material as fertilizer, while others are selling it to biogas companies for renewable energy. As envisioned, pomace would be introduced into anaerobic digesters that contain microorganisms that aid in its decomposition and produce methane gas that could be burnt to generate power.

Specific polyphenols in red wine pomace may be beneficial for dental hygiene. A study conducted at the Eastman Dental Center found that these polyphenols interfere with Streptococcus mutans, the bacterium in the mouth that causes tooth decay. Professor Hyun Koo, the lead researcher of the study, hoped as of 2008 to isolate these polyphenols to produce new mouthwashes that will help protect against cavities.

Grape pomace is also used in the oil and gas industry as a lost circulation material in oil-based drilling muds due to the pomace being fibrous and tannin-rich.

A 2004 study conducted by Erciyes University in Turkey found that pomace can also act as a natural food preservative that interferes with E. coli, Salmonella and Staphylococcus bacteria. Researchers pulverised the dried pomace from the white Turkish wine grape Emir Karasi and red Kalecik Karasi grapes; this was mixed with ethyl acetate, methanol or water and exposed to 14 different types of food bacteria. All 14 bacteria were inhibited to some degree by the pomace – depending on the grape variety and the concentration of the extract. The red wine Kalecik Karasi grape was the most effective; the researchers believed this was due to the higher concentration of polyphenols in red wine grape skins.

Oenocyanin, a natural red dye and food-coloring agent, is produced from grape pomace. Tartrates (potassium bitartrate, 'cream of tartar') and grape polyphenols can also be manufactured from grape pomace.

Apple pomace has long been a traditional feed for various kinds of livestock. The use of grape pomace as livestock feed is encouraged in order to reduce the release of grape processing residues in the environment, which can lead to serious pollution.

Apple pomace was used, in conjunction with whey, to flavor the first iteration of Fanta soft drink in Germany during World War II. This was done because wartime embargoes limited Coca-Cola of Germany's ability to import and manufacture the American beverage.

Apple pomace can also be milled in order to create apple flour, also known as apple pomace flour.

Legal regulations

Canada
According to the Canadian Food and Drug Regulations, pomace can be a potable alcoholic distillate or a mixture of potable alcoholic distillates obtained by distilled skin and pulp of sound ripe fruit after removal of the fruit juice, wine or fruit wine. Pomace may contain caramel, fruit, botanical substances, flavoring and flavoring preparations. Pomace may be described on its label as "(name of the fruit) Pomace" or "(name of the fruit) Marc" if all of the skin and pulp of the fruit used to make the pomace originate from the particular fruit.

See also
Acqua pazza
Olive mill pomace
Olive pomace oil
Piquette

References

Further reading

External links 

 

Biogas substrates
Oenology